{{DISPLAYTITLE:x1 Centauri}}

x1 Centauri is a star located in the constellation Centaurus. It is also known by its designations HD 107832 and HR 4712. The apparent magnitude of the star is about 5.3, meaning it is only visible to the naked eye under excellent viewing conditions. Its distance is about 440 light-years (140 parsecs), based on its parallax measured by the Hipparcos astrometry satellite.

x1 Centauri's spectral type is B8/9V, meaning it is a late B-type main sequence star. These types of stars are a few times more massive than the Sun, and have effective temperatures of about 10,000 to 30,000 K. x1 Centauri is just over 3 times more massive than the Sun and has a temperature of about 11,300 K. The star x2 Centauri, which lies about 0.4′ away from x1 Centauri, may or may not form a physical binary star system with x1 Centauri, as the two have similar proper motions and distances.

References 

http://www.alcyone.de/cgi-bin/search.pl?object=HR4712 

Centaurus (constellation)
B-type giants
Centauri, x1
107832
60449
4712
CD-34 08117
Centauri, 113